Devayat Bodar was a Yadav (Ahir) chieftain of Sorathia Ahir clan of Gujarat, He was an important figure known for his bravery, sacrifice and love for land, with whose help Ra' Navghan, Chudasama ruler (son of Ra' Dias ) got the throne of Sorath (Currently nearby area of Vansthali-Junagadh) back from Patan ruler Durlabhraj Solanki and Later became king of Saurashtra region.  

Devayat Bodar who was loyal to the Ra' kings brought Navghan as his own child. The Solanki king sent his army to find the Kunwar, intending to kill the only son of Ra' Diyas and end his dynasty. The sipahis searched and reached Devayat's village Alidar-bolidar. Where Ahir and Ahirani saved Ra' Navaghan by sacrificing their own son Vasana (Uga).

Early life
Devayat Bodar was born in Ahir community in Alidar-Bodidar village of Gujarat. He had a daughter named Jahal and a son named Uga(Vahan) from his wife Sonal(The Literary name is Saidhi Bai).

See also 
Ahir
History of Gujarat
Halar

References

Ahir
Indian folklore
Gujarati people